Holice is a village and municipality in the Dunajská Streda District in the Trnava Region of south-west Slovakia.

Component villages 
The municipality consists of eight formerly independent villages.

Geography
The municipality lies at an altitude of 119 metres and covers an area of 23.209 km². It has a population of about 1,825 people.

History
In the 9th century, the territory of Holice became part of the Kingdom of Hungary. In historical records the village was first mentioned in 1245.  After the Austro-Hungarian army disintegrated in November 1918, Czechoslovak troops occupied the area, later acknowledged internationally by the Treaty of Trianon. Between 1938 and 1945 Holice once more  became part of Miklós Horthy's Hungary through the First Vienna Award. Village Holice was created in 1940 by joining the settlements Beketfa, Kostolná Gala, Stará Gala, and Póšfa. From 1945 until the Velvet Divorce, it was part of Czechoslovakia. Since then it has been part of Slovakia.

Demography 
At the 2001 Census the recorded population of the village was 1,824 while an end-2008 estimate by the Statistical Office had the villages's population as 1,889. As of 2001, 96% of its population were Hungarians and 3.73% were Slovaks.

See also
 List of municipalities and towns in Slovakia

References

Genealogical resources

The records for genealogical research are available at the state archive "Statny Archiv in Bratislava, Slovakia"
 Roman Catholic church records (births/marriages/deaths): 1689-1905 (parish A)

External links
Surnames of living people in Holice

Villages and municipalities in Dunajská Streda District
Hungarian communities in Slovakia